Dharapani is a small town in Arghakhanchi District in the Lumbini Zone of southern Nepal. At the time of the 1991 Nepal census, the town had a population of 5236 living in 1020 houses. At the time of the 2001 Nepal census, the population was 6455, of which 65% was literate.

References

Populated places in Arghakhanchi District